The 2012 V-League season is the 56th season of Vietnam's professional football league and started on 31 December 2011 and finished on 19 August 2012. On 15 December it was announced that the league would change name and would simply be known as the Premier League. Then, it was changed name to Super League.

Teams 
Đồng Tâm Long An were relegated to the 2012 Vietnamese First Division after finishing the 2011 season in the bottom two after a season of upheaval and numerous coaches hired and fired. It was a far fall from grace for the two-time champions.

Hà Nội ACB were also relegated after finishing bottom, but later merged with Hòa Phát Hà Nội to retain their place in the top flight. They were also renamed to Hà Nội.

They were replaced by Vietnamese First Division champions Sài Gòn Xuân Thành who were renamed to Sàigòn for the start of the campaign and then renamed back during mid season. and runners up Kienlongbank Kiên Giang. Kiên Giang are based in the southern city of Rạch Giá.

Stadia and locations

Ownership changes

Managerial changes

League table

Positions by round

Results

Summary

Matches

Match-day 1

Match-day 2

Match-day 3

Match-day 4

Match-day 5

Match-day 6

Match-day 7

Match-day 8

Match-day 9

Match-day 10

Match-day 11

Match-day 12

Match-day 13

Match-day 14

Match-day 15

Match-day 16

Match-day 17

Match-day 18

Match-day 19

Match-day 20

Match-day 21

Match-day 22

Match-day 23

Match-day 24

Match-day 25

Match-day 26

Top goalscorers
The Top Scorers as of 20 August 2012:

Awards

Monthly awards

Annual awards

Manager of the Season
 Lê Huỳnh Đức (SHB Đà Nẵng)

Best player of the Season
 Alexander Prent (SHB Đà Nẵng)

Best Referee
 Võ Quang Vinh

References

External links
 Vietnam Football Federation

Vietnamese Super League seasons
Vietnam
Vietnam
1